Anne Sowerby Ruston (born 10 June 1963) is an Australian politician who served as Minister for Families and Social Services in the Morrison Government from 2019 to 2022. She has been a Senator for South Australia since 2012.

Before entering politics Ruston was a commercial rose-grower and chief executive of the National Wine Centre. She was appointed to the Senate to fill a casual vacancy caused by the resignation of Mary Jo Fisher. Ruston served as Assistant Minister for Agriculture and Water Resources in the Turnbull Government from 2015 to 2018 and as Assistant Minister for International Development and the Pacific in the Morrison Government from 2018 to 2019. She was elevated to cabinet following the 2019 election.

Early life
Ruston was born on 10 June 1963 in Renmark, South Australia. She went to Renmark High School where she was a school friend of future Chief of Army Rick Burr. She holds the degree of Bachelor of Business from the University of Southern Queensland.

Career
In 1987, Ruston began working as an electorate officer for state Liberal MP Peter Arnold. She joined the staff of state tourism minister Graham Ingerson in 1993 as a tourism policy adviser, and in 1996 was appointed as an executive officer at the Wine and Tourism Council. Her appointment was controversial as Ingerson was accused by the state opposition of interfering in the selection process in her favour.

Ruston was closely involved with the creation of the National Wine Centre of Australia, initially as project director and then as the centre's inaugural CEO. It was publicly announced by Premier John Olsen in 1998 as a centre for wine tourism and education, as well as office space for various wine industry groups. Ruston oversaw the construction phase of the centre, announcing three months prior to its opening in 2001 that she would not renew her contract. In 2000 she and the centre's chairman Rick Allert were called before a parliamentary committee over possible breaches of procurement guidelines. By the time of her departure the centre was employing over 100 people, but was reportedly struggling to break even and required a bailout from the state government. Its financial difficulties were attributed to a decline in air travel following the September 11 attacks and the collapse of Ansett Australia. However, independent MP Peter Lewis stated that the business plan approved by Ruston and Allert overstated likely visitor numbers.

In 2003, Ruston and her husband purchased Ruston's Roses, a commercial rose-growing property in Renmark established by her uncle David Ruston in 1948. He was the first Australian to serve as president of the World Federation of Rose Societies. However, as a result of the Millennium drought she had to suspend commercial growing for three years, and the gardens subsequently evolved into "primarily a retail-tourism business" with the addition of a tourism centre, function rooms and cafe. She was managing director until her appointment to the Senate in 2012, after which she remained as a co-owner.

Politics
Ruston became a vice-president of the Liberal Party of Australia (South Australian Division) in 2011. In May 2012 she won preselection in third place on the party's Senate ticket for the next federal election, a position seen as "unsafe" due to the candidacy of independent senator Nick Xenophon. However, incumbent senator Mary Jo Fisher resigned the following month and Ruston was chosen instead for the resulting casual vacancy, receiving support from the party's moderate faction in what The Australian described as a "factional brawl". She was formally appointed by a joint sitting of the Parliament of South Australia on 5 September 2012.

Ruston was a deputy whip from September 2014 to May 2016. She became Assistant Minister for Agriculture and Water Resources in the First Turnbull Ministry in September 2015. During the August 2018 Liberal leadership spills, she served as Manager of Government Business in the Senate for five days. She was subsequently appointed Assistant Minister for International Development and the Pacific in the First Morrison Ministry.

Following the 2019 election, Ruston was elevated to the Cabinet and was appointed Minister for Families and Social Services in the Second Morrison Ministry. She was additionally reappointed as Manager of Government Business in the Senate. In March 2021 she was also made Minister for Women's Safety, a new position.

Political positions
In 2017, when Cory Bernardi moved a motion to ban sex-selective abortion, Ruston was one of the ten senators who voted in favour. The motion was defeated by a vote of 10 – 36.

Personal life
Ruston is married to Richard Fewster and they have a son.

References

External links
Summary of parliamentary voting for Senator Anne Ruston on TheyVoteForYou.org.au

1963 births
Living people
Abbott Government
Members of the Australian Senate
Members of the Australian Senate for South Australia
Liberal Party of Australia members of the Parliament of Australia
Australian women in business
Women members of the Australian Senate
University of Southern Queensland alumni
Turnbull Government
21st-century Australian politicians
21st-century Australian women politicians
Government ministers of Australia
Women government ministers of Australia
Morrison Government